Today My Way was an LP album by Patti Page, released by Columbia Records in 1967. The album was a collection of Page's interpretations of popular middle-of-the-road and country hits of the era.

The album was reissued, combined with the 1970 Patti Page album Honey Come Back, in compact disc format, by Collectables Records on November 25, 2003.  In addition, three bonus tracks were added to the CD: "Up, Up and Away" and "On the Other Side" (after the 11 tracks of this album) and "Toy Balloon" (after the tracks from Honey Come Back).

Track listing

References

Patti Page albums
Columbia Records albums
1967 albums